Abu Hurraira Dhanani is an international jiu-jitsu athlete from Pakistan. Abu participated in the World Games, World Championship, Asian Beach Games, and Asian Indoor Martial Art Games, and  won the Silver medal in the Ju-jitsu World Championship 2015.

Abu has won three Asian gold medals for Pakistan in the Asian Championship 2010, Asian Championship 2010, & Asian Beach Games 2014, respectively. 

As of October 2022, Abu Hurraira Dhanani held four gold medals, six silver medals, and three Bronze medals in international events which is a result of an undying drive and evidence of his strength of character.

In September 2021, Abu won 2 bronze medals in the 5th Asian Championship .

Abu started playing Jiu-Jitsu, and earned his laurels, from Pakistan Jiu-Jitsu since 2004.  Abu has remained unbeaten in jiu jitsu in Pakistan since 2010. He is also the only athlete who represented Pakistan in the World Games 2017.

Abu Hurraira Dhanani also gives free training in self-defense to orphans and females and spreads awareness of self-defense and harassment.

References

External links 

 Facebook page

1990 births
Living people